Fábio Virginio de Lima (born 30 June 1993) is a professional association football player who plays for Al Wasl. Born in Brazil, Lima is naturalized to represent United Arab Emirates internationally.

Club career 
Lima was signed by 2nd tier club Atlético Goianiense in 2012 after having a shorter span with Icasa. In 2013, he was loaned out to Serie A club Vasco da Gama making a single appearance.

On 21 July 2014, Lima joined UAE Arabian Gulf League side Al Wasl on a two-year loan after being recommended by manager Jorginho.

International career 
In February 2020, Lima obtained the Emirati citizenship. On 12 October 2020, he made his international debut with the UAE in a friendly match against Uzbekistan.

Career statistics 
As of 19 March 2023

Other

UAE League Cup

&

Arab Club Champions Cup

2018–19 [4 Apps , 0 Goals , 0 Assist]2019–20 [3 Apps , 2 Goals , 1 Assist]

International goal

Note

Reference

External link 
 

1993 births
Living people
Sportspeople from Paraíba
Emirati footballers
United Arab Emirates international footballers
Brazilian footballers
Brazilian emigrants to the United Arab Emirates
Association football midfielders
Naturalized citizens of the United Arab Emirates
Associação Desportiva Recreativa e Cultural Icasa players
Atlético Clube Goianiense players
Al-Wasl F.C. players
Campeonato Brasileiro Série A players
Campeonato Brasileiro Série B players
UAE Pro League players
Brazilian expatriate footballers
Expatriate footballers in the United Arab Emirates